Gmina Goraj is an urban-rural gmina (administrative district) in Biłgoraj County, Lublin Voivodeship, in eastern Poland.

Villages
Apart from the town of Goraj, Gmina Goraj contains the villages and settlements of Abramów, Albinów Duży, Albinów Mały, Gilów, Hosznia Abramowska, Hosznia Ordynacka, Jędrzejówka, Kondraty, Majdan Abramowski, Średniówka, Zagrody and Zastawie.

Neighbouring gminas
Gmina Goraj is bordered by the gminas of Chrzanów, Dzwola, Frampol, Radecznica and Turobin.

References
Polish official population figures 2006

Goraj
Biłgoraj County